Weibo Corporation is a Chinese social network company known for the microblogging website Sina Weibo. It is based in Beijing, China.

History
Weibo was established by SINA Corporation as T.CN, but it changed its name to Weibo in 2012.

Currently, it is listed on NASDAQ.

See also

Microblogging in China
Sina Weibo

References 

Sina Corp
Companies based in Beijing
Online companies of China
Internet properties established in 2010
Mass media companies established in 2010
Companies listed on the Nasdaq
Chinese companies established in 2010